Grand Designs is a British television series produced by Boundless and broadcast on Channel 4 which features unusual and often elaborate architectural homebuilding projects.

The programme has been presented by Kevin McCloud since it first aired in April 1999, and more than 200 episodes have been broadcast in twenty-three series.

Format
Episodes generally follow a regular format, with small variations depending on the progress of the build. At the beginning of an episode, McCloud meets the clients embarking on the project; he visits the site with them, and discusses the plans for the building. A computer visualisation or computer-aided design view of the intended project is shown. Once ground work commences, he visits the site periodically, following the build progress, noting any changes, hitches or delays; the build frequently runs over budget and completes later than scheduled. McCloud will often do a piece to camera concentrating on any unique materials or features in the house. He visits again once the building is made watertight, and the first and second fixes have commenced. He makes a final visit to the site in its finished or near-finished state, once the occupants have moved in. A tour of the house is then given; McCloud brings the episode to a close summarising the house, its construction, and his opinions.

If a house is not completed before filming finishes, it will sometimes be revisited in a later episode. In more recent series, McCloud revisits past unfinished builds once they have been completed and may stay overnight.

The properties featured in Grand Designs are hugely varied in style and design, from underground homes to converted water towers to buildings constructed in methods of sustainable architecture; the only common factor is that they are all unusual or extravagant. The most popular programme of the series for both Kevin McCloud and viewers was Ben Law's home with a sweet chestnut frame made from his own woodland, and costing very little. This was broadcast as episode 3 of series 3.

Episodes and spin-offs

The first episode of Grand Designs aired on 29 April 1999. Since then over two hundred episodes have been produced and broadcast in twenty three series to date. The Grand Designs brand has also grown in this time with a number of spin-off shows also being made:

Grand Designs Indoors
a lesser known spin-off, with the same format. As the name suggests the series concentrated on the interior transformation of these properties. Only containing six episodes, this series was broadcast in 2001.
Grand Designs Abroad 
focused on properties outside the United Kingdom and was broadcast in 2004.
Grand Designs Revisited
episodes where McCloud visits a previously featured house, recaps the build and then looks at how the house has settled in to its surroundings and how the owners have settled in. The episodes are generally included in the Grand Designs seasons, but can be promoted as a separate show. The Co-Op revisited, twice, the Hedgehog Self-Build Co-operative, began in 1996.
Grand Designs Trade Secrets
a spin-off broadcast for two seasons immediately after the main Channel 4 show each week for series seven and eight of Grand Designs. Acting as a companion piece, it gave hints and tips about building and showed some "behind the scenes" material from that week's show.
Grand Designs Live and Grand Designs Live: Today
one-hour daily programmes broadcast for nine days during the Grand Designs Live 2008 event in London.
Grand Designs Australia premiered on 21 October 2010 in Australia on The LifeStyle Channel.
Kevin's Grand Design
A 2-episode special on McCloud's development of a caravan park into a 44 unit 'FAB' housing estate.
Grand Designs New Zealand
hosted by Chris Moller for its first six seasons, premiered on 4 October 2015 in New Zealand on TV3. The first season consisted of 8 x 60 minutes episodes. The second season premiered on 25 September 2016 and also consisted of 8 x 60 minutes episodes. A third season of eight episodes aired in 2017.
Grand Designs: RIBA House of the Year 
Launched in 2015, McCloud is joined by Damion Burrows and Zac Monro, as they explore some of Britain's most cutting-edge homes, all of them in the running for the prestigious prize.
Grand Designs: The Street 
McCloud follows ten households constructing their own homes, on a plot of ex-Ministry of Defence land, as part of creating a new street in a self-build project, Graven Hill near Bicester in Oxfordshire. Aired in the first half of 2019 on Channel 4. Two more series have been commissioned.
Grand Designs Sweden 2020

DVDs
The original Grand Designs series has been released on DVD in the United Kingdom, however the DVD series numbers do not match the television series as some houses are excluded, and the DVDs do not include "revisited" episodes, where there is only a few minutes of new footage. Instead, the new footage from these episodes is included as an extra on the older DVDs.

Grand Designs: The Complete Series 1 (two-disc set, released 2 September 2009)
Grand Designs: The Complete Series 2 (two-disc set, released 30 September 2009)
Grand Designs: The Complete Series 3 (two-disc set, released 5 November 2009)
Grand Designs: Series 4 (two-disc set, released 19 March 2009)
Grand Designs: Series 5 (five-disc set, released 6 August 2009, corresponds to TV series 5, 6 and 7)
Grand Designs: Series 6 (two-disc set, released 1 April 2010, corresponds to TV series 8)
Grand Designs: Series 7 (two-disc set, released 7 August 2010, corresponds to TV series 9)
Grand Designs: Series 8 (two-disc set, released 5 September 2011, corresponds to TV series 10)
Grand Designs: Series 9 (two-disc set, released 15 October 2012, corresponds to TV series 11)
Grand Designs: Series 10 (two-disc set, released 30 September 2013, corresponds to TV series 12)

The Australian release of the original Grand Designs series differs from the UK releases, in that they do not include any "revisited" footage at all.

Grand Designs Australia: Series 1 (three-disc set, released 4 August 2011, corresponds to TV series 1)

Exhibition

Grand Designs Live takes place biannually, in London in the spring and in Birmingham in the autumn. The exhibitions display contemporary design and technology for the home and garden, with stands for suppliers and manufacturers to promote their goods and services. Design and media personalities McCloud, George Clarke and Jo Hamilton are show ambassadors.

The nine-day Grand Designs Live 2008 event, held at London's ExCeL, attracted over 100,000 visitors. To accompany the event Channel 4 broadcast two live daily programmes directly from the show, Grand Designs Live: Today and Grand Designs Live.

Grand Designs Live launched in Australia in Sydney on 21–23 October 2011. It launched in Melbourne on 21–23 September 2012 and returned to Sydney on 5–7 October 2012.

Awards and nominations
The programme has been nominated a number of times in the BAFTA Features category and won in 2015.

Pop culture references
Irish singer Orla Gartland referenced the show in her song "Heavy" with the lyric "I just wanna hang with you and watch Grand Designs".

In The IT Crowd episode Bad Boys, Moss shoplifts several copies of the same Grand Design DVD from a mall store.

See also
 Kevin McCloud's Man Made Home
 List of Grand Designs episodes

References

External links
Grand Designs at Channel4.com
Grand Designs Live
Grand Designs Magazine
Grand Designs Australia Official Website
Grand Designs New Zealand Official Website 
Grand Designs: The Street at Channel 4 

1999 British television series debuts
2000s British television series
2010s British television series
2020s British television series
Building
Architecture in the United Kingdom
Television shows about British architecture
Channel 4 original programming
Television series by Fremantle (company)